True North is a studio album by English singer-songwriter Michael Chapman. It was released on 8 February 2019 through Paradise of Bachelors.

Track listing

Personnel
Michael Chapman - vocals, guitar, bass
Steve Gunn - guitar, drums
Bridget St John - vocals
B.J. Cole - pedal steel guitar
Sarah Smout - cello
Technical
Jimmy Robertson - recording, mixing

Charts

References

External links
 

2019 albums